The St. Johns Twin Cinema, formerly known as the Northgate Theater and the St. Johns Theater, is a movie theater located in the St. Johns neighborhood of Portland, Oregon, United States. It was opened in 1913 by the People's Amusement Company.

History
Plans to build a "modern" theater in what was then the city of St. Johns were announced in 1913 by C. A. Metzger of the People's Amusement Company. The blueprints called for a concrete -story, 50 by 100 ft. building that was estimated to cost $30,000 (US$ adjusted for inflation). It featured a 650-seat auditorium.

In 1915, the St. Johns City Council voted in favor of an ordinance that would censor a film entitled The House of Bondage and put in place a board of censorship to weed out "lewd" films, spearheaded by socialist mayor A. W. Vincent. Managers of the theatre were supportive of the censorship board and refused to show the film a year before the ordinance was enacted. The theater hosted a town hall event in 1928 about the proposition of a new bridge over the Willamette River in St. Johns. The St. Johns Bridge was completed in 1931.

In 1983, the theater was fully renovated by David A. Jones and David H. Evans, who were renovating several theaters around Portland. The main floor auditorium featured 350 seats and the upstairs featured 225 seats. On July 7, 1986 there was a fire in an apartment above the theater after a firecracker was thrown through the window and into a waste basket.

References

External links
 St. Johns Twin Cinema official web site

1911 establishments in Oregon
Buildings and structures in St. Johns, Portland, Oregon
Cinemas and movie theaters in Oregon
Companies based in St. Johns, Portland, Oregon
Theatres in Portland, Oregon